Merafong City Local Municipality is a local municipality in West Rand District Municipality, Gauteng, South Africa.  Its boundaries encloses some of the richest gold mines in the world.  It is situated about 65 km from Johannesburg and is serviced by a number of major roads, including the N12 from Johannesburg to Beaufort West and the N14 (the main road between Gauteng and Vryburg via Ventersdorp).

Formerly a cross-border municipality, the entire municipality was transferred to the North West province following the abolition of cross-border municipalities by an amendment to the South African Constitution in 2005. The municipality was a part of the North West Province from 2005 to 2009, when it was reincorporated into the Gauteng Province by another amendment to the Constitution, following often violent protests in the township of Khutsong.

Merafong's historical development is closely knit with the discovery of rich gold deposits in the early 1930s.

Towns
Fochville is the oldest town in the region and was declared a town in 1951.

The town Carletonville was named after Guy Carleton Jones, an engineer from the Gold Fields Ltd mining company, who played a prominent role in the discovery of the West Wits gold field, of which Carletonville forms a part.  The mining company decided in November 1946 to establish the town. Carletonville was proclaimed in 1948 and attained Town Council Status on 1 July 1959.

Wedela is situated in between Western Deep Levels and Elandsrand mine. The town's name is derived from the prefixes of the two mines: the "Wed-" from Western Deep Levels and the "-ela" from Elandsrand.  Wedela was established as a mining village in December 1978 by Harry Oppenheimer, and municipal status was granted to the town on 1 January 1990.

Attached to Fochville and Carletonville are the towns of Khutsong, Kokosi, Greenspark, Welverdiend, and Blybank.

Main places
The 2001 census divided the municipality into the following main places:

Politics 

The municipal council consists of fifty-five members elected by mixed-member proportional representation. Twenty-eight councillors are elected by first-past-the-post voting in twenty-eight wards, while the remaining twenty-seven are chosen from party lists so that the total number of party representatives is proportional to the number of votes received. In the election of 1 November 2021, the African National Congress (ANC) lost their majority of seats on the council

The following table shows the results of the election.

Management
The power utility Eskom has identified Merafong as a municipality with a poor payment record. Its debt with Eskom rose from over R570 million in 2021 to R700 million in 2022 when they were in discussions with the utility to address the monthly shortfalls.

References

External links
 Official website

Local municipalities of the West Rand District Municipality